Çələbilər may refer to:

 Çələbilər, Barda, Azerbaijan
 Çələbilər, Jabrayil, Azerbaijan
 Çelebiler, Sındırgı, Turkey